Calliptamus is a genus of grasshoppers in the family Acrididae. Species of Calliptamus are found in Africa and the northern Palearctic realm (mainland Europe not including Scandinavia) through to Japan.

Species
Species within this genus include:

 Calliptamus abbreviatus Ikonnikov, 1913
 Calliptamus balucha Uvarov, 1938
 Calliptamus barbarus (Costa, 1836)
 Calliptamus cicatricosus Bolívar, 1889
 Calliptamus coelesyriensis Giglio-Tos, 1893
 Calliptamus cyrenaicus Jago, 1963
 Calliptamus deserticola Vosseler, 1902
 Calliptamus italicus (Linnaeus, 1758) (Italian locust) type species (as Gryllus italicus L)
 Calliptamus madeirae Uvarov, 1937 (Madeira Pincer Grasshopper)
 Calliptamus montanus Chopard, 1937
 Calliptamus plebeius (Walker, 1870)
 Calliptamus siciliae Ramme, 1927 (Pygmy Pincer Grasshopper)
 Calliptamus tenuicercis Tarbinsky, 1930
 Calliptamus testaceus Walker, 1870
 Calliptamus turanicus Tarbinsky, 1930
 Calliptamus wattenwylianus Pantel, 1896
 † Calliptamus strausi Harz, 1973

References

External links

 

Acrididae
Orthoptera of Africa
Orthoptera of Asia
Orthoptera of Europe
Caelifera genera